Fishery and fishing industry plays a significant part in the national economy of Pakistan. With a coastline of about 1,120 km, Pakistan has enough fishery resources that remain to be developed. Most of the population of the coastal areas of Sindh and Balochistan depends on fisheries for livelihood. It is also a major source of export earning.

Fishing industry is managed by the Fisheries Development Commissioner (FDC) under the Ministry Food, Agriculture Livestock (MFAL) of Government of Pakistan. The office of the FDC is responsible for policy, planning and coordination with provincial fisheries departments and other national and international agencies such as Asia-Pacific Fishery Commission. The marine subsector is overlooked by Marine Fisheries Department (MFD).

The Pakistan Agricultural Research Council (PARC) is engaged in the research of the industry. Some universities in the country are also involved in basic fisheries research.

Resources

Pakistan has many marine and inland fishery resources. The potential was estimated at 1 million tonnes/year from the marine subsector alone. The commercially important resources include near 250 demersal fish species, 50 small pelagic fish species, 15 medium-sized pelagic species and 20 large pelagic fish species. In addition, there are also 15 commercial species of shrimp, 12 of cephalopods and 5 of lobster. The effect of the Indus River Delta on the marine resources of the coastline of Sindh is substantial, as this river system has been transporting enormous quantities of nutrients and sediment to the continental shelf for centuries. Pakistan has an extensive inland water areas system, which is mainly dominated by the Indus River. These water bodies, depending on their type, possess varying potential for development of the inland and aquaculture subsectors. Inland water bodies, like dams, water locks, reservoirs, rivers, lakes and ponds cover an area of approximately 8 million hectares.

Marine varieties
The shrimp variety includes the species of Penaeus indicus and Penaeus monodon among 12 other. Surveys in the Arabian Sea indicate that commercial species of crustaceans like shrimps and lobsters are overexploited. Crabs, cephalopods and other molluscs are an unconventional resource. However, there is a potential in the export market as a substitute for these. Demersal fish resources show the signs of being exploited, hence only limited expansion of catch is possible in future. There may be a possibility of expanding the catch the small pelagic fish resources by venturing further offshore. It is very much likely that the fishermen would have to consider using new fishing methods in order to achieve this. As for the larger variety of pelagic fish, especially Skipjack tuna and its relatives, are available in the Exclusive Economic Zone of Pakistan in the Karachi District. Fishing for these usually result in by-catches of marlin and shark species. Local fishing fleet commonly harvests the species of Frigate mackerel, Indian mackerel, Spanish mackerel, barracuda and dolphinfish. The production figures of 2006 showed overexploitation relative to maximum sustainable yield level. A large variety of mesopelagic fish exist just off the continental shelf and are barely exploited. These resources are prime candidates for conversion to fishmeal for use in poultry and aquaculture but no commercial use is available in the country. Mussels, oysters, clams, seaweed, kelp, sea urchins and other marine resources also exist in Pakistan but further research data is required in order to evaluate the feasibility of propagating the mariculture of these varieties.

Subsectors

Marine subsector
Pakistan has a continental shelf area of 50,270 km2 and coastline length of 1,120 km. The total maritime zone of Pakistan is over 30 percent of the land area. The coastal belt is characterized by a meshwork of estuaries and creeks with mangrove forestry that serve as nursery grounds for species of finfish and shellfish. In 1958, the first modern fish harbour was constructed at the Karachi District. Later, the fleet expanded and is now mostly mechanized.

Harbours

Karachi Fish Harbour is the biggest and oldest of its kind in Pakistan, being used by all types of fishing boats. Currently more than 4,000 fishing craft are based in it. At present, it can be assumed that the harbour caters for the needs of near 75 percent of the local fleet.

The major fish harbours of Pakistan are:
Karachi Fish Harbour handles about 90% of fish and seafood catch in Pakistan and 95% of fish and seafood exports from Pakistan.
Karachi Fisheries Harbour is being operated by Provincial Government of Sindh.
Korangi Fish Harbour is being managed by Federal Ministry of Ports & Shipping.
Pasni Fish Harbour being operated by Provincial Government of Balochistan.
Gwadar Fish Harbour being operated by Federal Ministry of Communication.

Methods
Shrimp fishery
The shrimp fishery is very meaningful because of foreign exchange earned and employment produced from it. It is only permitted in province of Sindh. Commercial shrimp trawling started in 1958, after the MFD introduced mechanization of larger fishing vessels. Now almost all of the shrimp trawlers are equipped with winches for net hauling. However, shrimp can also be caught by the use of cast net, which is locally termed 'thukri'. The catching is mainly carried out in shallow depths from October to March. It is also caught in eustaries and brackish waters from July to September. The catch is then processed frozen for the objective of exporting to North American and European Union markets.

Tuna fishery
The fishing of tuna varieties is another appreciable aspect of the industry that is carried out by artisanal fishing vessels. Usually, the fleet shoot the gillnets in the evening and fetch them the next morning. The main target are the pelagic species with higher commercial values. The catch is exported as chilled to neighbouring country of Iran through informal channels for canning purposes. This fetches more profit than if exported to Sri Lanka in dried and salted form.

Benthic fishery
The deep sea resources remain comparatively unexploited because local vessels are neither suitable nor equipped for deep-water fishery. The idea has motivated entrepreneurs to augment their deep-sea fishing craft for use of the resources. Small-scale benthic or demersal fishery is most common in coastal inshore waters. Fishermen use nylon gillnet, locally termed 'ruch', with a mesh of about 150 mm long. Benthic varieties include the marine jewfish, croakers, grunters, snappers, groupers, ribbonfish and pomfrets.

Pelagic fishery
A small-scale pelagic fishery is in operation in Sindh, using special nets, locally termed 'katra'. Fishing is carried out from 'hora' boats - wooden sailboats with pointed ends, a broad breadth and long-shaft outboard engine. In depths shallower than 20 m, shoals of clupeids, especially the Indian Oil Sardine, are usually intended. Such operations are mainly based at Ibrahim Hydri and Chashma Goth villages. The desirable months are from October to November and February to April. The catch is the prime candidate for conversion into fishmeal.

Vessels
As of 2000, the number of docked fishery vessels was near 6,000. The two main types of fishing craft include:
Mechanized docked boats: There are over 4,000 boats of this kind registered, which constitute shrimp trawlers and as well as gillnetters. Both are also locally made of wood, according to traditional design and fitted with 80–220 hp diesel engines. The average length of a trawler is 10–25 m while that of a gillnetter is 15–35 m. For hauling, many trawlers have a transom stern. Gillnetters are pointed at both ends and the net is pulled over the side. Freezing vessels also operate in the EEZ and all their catch is exported.
Mechanized sailboats: Made of wood and equipped with two or more outboard engines, but generally smaller than docked vessels, they are locally called 'hora' boats. Most of these sailboats now operate in freshwater bodies. 'Doonda' boats are custom-built fibreglass scrapped lifeboats, with an average length of 7–10 m and 22–33 hp engines. These boats are able to function in up to 20 m depth. As of 2006, there are over 2,000 active boats of this kind.

Inland subsector
Freshwater capture fisheries are dominated by the Indus River and its tributaries. The fish fauna of the Indus system in its northern part is cold-water type, while the greater middle and southern parts of the system are warm-water zones. Fisheries in rivers and reservoirs account for more than 80 percent of total inland fish production. The riverine fishery management system is operated mainly by provincial fisheries departments. They enforce regulatory laws that restrict catch by size of fish and establish closed seasons.

Lakes

In the Sindh alone there are more than 100 natural lakes of different sizes covering an area of about 100,000 ha. Among them Haleji lake (1,800 ha) West of Thatta, Kinjhar Lake (12,000 ha) North of Thatta and Manchar lake (16,000 ha) in Dadu District are quite important for fish production. Manchar alone supports 2,000 fishing families. Apart from these big lakes, a cluster of small lakes extend over 40,000 ha. The natural lakes in Punjab cover about 7,000 ha. Some of the lakes, such as Namal lake (480 ha), Uchhali lake (943 ha), Jahlar lake (100 ha), Kallar Kahar (100 ha), Kharal lake (235 ha) and Khabikki lake (283 ha) are brackish and are too saline to support aquaculture. Other man made lakes include Mangla dam, Terbela dam and Chashma Barrage.

Aquaculture subsector
Aquaculture (or fish farming) is new in Pakistan. However, there is immense potential for development of the sector. Aquaculture production has rapidly increased since 2000 from around 10-15 thousands tonnes to reach over 100,000 tonnes in 2006 and 2007. Despite its vast fresh, brackish and marine water resources only carp culture is practiced in ponds. In Pakistan, the fish fauna is rich but only seven warm water species and two cold water species are cultivated on a commercial scale. Aquaculture has also received a substantial amount of government investment, and facilities are now in place that can provide the basis for a major future expansion. With the exception of trout culture in the northern regions, virtually all aquaculture consists of pond culture of various carp species.

Freshwater farming
Freshwater carp farming is the major aquaculture activity in Punjab, Sindh and Khyber Pakhtunkhwa. The northern mountains of Pakistan have good potential for trout culture, but production is still very small. According to the latest estimates, the total area covered by fish ponds is about 60,500 ha in Pakistan, is 49,170 ha in Sindh, is 10,500 ha in Punjab, 560 ha in Khyber Pukhtunkhwa, and 240 ha in Balochistan, Gilgit-Baltistan and Azad Kashmir. More than 12,000 fish farms have been established across Pakistan. The average size of farm ranges form 6-9 ha. About 50,000 people are employed in the sector.

In Sindh, the majority of farms are located in Thatta, Badin and Dadu, the three districts through which the River Indus passes. Badin and Thatta have waterlogged floodplain areas suitable for fish farming. In Punjab, farms are located mostly in irrigated areas or where there is abundant rain and the soil is alluvial. Muzaffar Garh, Multan, Sheikhupura, Gujranwala and Attock districts have most farms. Khyber-Pukhtunkhwa has comparatively fewer farms, with trout farms in Chitral, Swat, Dir, Malakand, Mansehra and FATA. Carp culture is practised in Dera Ismail Khan, Kohat, Mardan, Swabi and the Abbotabad districts.

On a typical carp farm in Pakistan, the ratio of the warm-water species stocked on the farm is catla (10–20%), rohu (30–35%), mrigal (15–20%), grass carp (15–20%) and silver carp (15–20%). Some carp farms use a semi-intensive culture system. Intensive aquaculture has not yet been developed because of non-availability of low-cost feed and limited production expertise. Cold-water aquaculture provides a unique opportunity in the mountainous areas of Khyber Pakhtunkhwa, Balochistan, Azad Kashmir and Gilgit-Baltistan. At present two species, brown trout and rainbow trout are being produced and cultured successfully. The culture of GIFT Tilapia has also gained popularity during quite recently.

Modern Technologies; Introduction of First In-Pond Raceways System Technology in Pakistan
Lack of awareness of modern aquaculture techniques and floating aquafeed had been the major impediments in development of this sector. After strenuous efforts of FEEDing Pakistan Program (Promoting Aquaculture Sector) of American Soybean Association (ASA) and World Initiative for Human Health (WISHH) funded by United States Department of Agriculture (USDA) and implemented by R.S.N. Janjua, Country Representative of ASA/WISHH and C.E., SoyPak, Pvt. Ltd from 2011 for introduction of both floating soy-based feed in Pakistan and tilapia culture with Fisheries Development Board (FDB) in Pakistan (https://www.youtube.com/channel/UCXgYH9zOolM6PcBjRvJnUgA). Major tangible outcome of this program was establishment of the first extruded aquafeed mill (2013) and tilapia hatchery (2014) in Pakistan which were milestones in history of Aquaculture industry of Pakistan. Since these historic breakthroughs, Aquaculture industry has revolutionized and embracing the modern technologies. In-Pond raceways technology (IPRS) is the most modern strategy in Aquaculture industry which has combined the features and benefits of raceway technology, cage culture, recirculating aquaculture system and pond culture. SoyPak, Pvt. Ltd. (IPRS and Aquaculture consultancy firm in Pakistan) trained human resources from aquaculture industry and academia in IPRS technology and has been closely involved and monitored the recent construction (2019) and operation of first IPRS in Southern Pakistan (https://www.youtube.com/watch?v=86OQ3NejyW8). Following advantages can be achieved from IPRS technology in Pakistan:
(i) Improved fish production (75 – 150 Kg/m3), (ii) Reduced production cost per unit of fish production (<30 – 35%), (iii) Improved Feed Conversion (FCR: 1.00 – 1.4) and feeding efficiency, (iv) 100% fish catch rate without discharge of water from pond, (v) Staggered stocking and harvest; culturing different species in different raceways, minimize market prices risk, (vi) Easier fish health management and production operation – minimal use of drugs and chemical to ensure food security, (vii) 70% capture of nutrient in form of feces and use as crop fertilizer, (viii) Zero water discharge for environmental protection and sustainability of natural resources. Water is only added to compensate for evaporative loss or seepage. (xi) Ecofriendly technique, (x) Harvest procedures and cost of labor for fish movement are simplified and significantly reduced, (xi) Efficient provision of animal protein to consumers (https://www.aquaculturealliance.org/advocate/in-pond-raceway-systems-introduced-in-pakistan/?segid=9de135f1-b03d-44c9-8756-3fd00836e892).

Mariculture potential
Coastal aquaculture (or mariculture) is almost absent in Pakistan despite its potential. Small-scale marine shrimp farming is carried out mainly near the Indus River Delta, and has yet to produce appreciable results. A mariculture farm in Sonmiani was funded by USAID for developing sustainable production of edible shrimp. A potential for developing hatcheries of other crustacean varieties exist as well. Recent advances in field of genetic engineering indicate that marine oysters can also be farmed. Pakistan has 9 species of native species oysters belonging to genera of Crassostrea, Saccostrea and Ostrea, can be a good source of nutrition. At present, there is no commercial harvesting or hatchery culture of oysters in country. First cage in sea have been instaled in Baluchistan.

Recreation subsector
Recreational fishing in Pakistan is usually looked over by the PGFA - Pakistan Game Fish Association. There are three main types of recreational fisheries in Pakistan: billfish and tuna fishing in the EEZ of Karachi; sport fishing (pelagic) in coastal waters; and hand-line fishing (bottom fishing) in inter-tidal and shallow waters. About 1,000 people with 120–150 fishing boats are involved in this sector. No license is required. However, their boats are required to be registered by Marine Mercantile department for seaworthiness. There are three boating clubs: The Karachi Yacht Club, The Karachi Boat Club and the Defence Marina Club. A number of fishing tournaments take place annually like the All Pakistan Billfish Tournament and Fish'nTac Anfling Championship, Karachi. The reigning Pakistan Saltwater Angling Champion is Orooj Ahmed Ali having caught a Black Marlin weighing 396 lbs in the All Pakistan Billfish Tournament, December 5, 1999, the heaviest fish caught on rod and reel in the Arabian Sea and the record stands to date.

Production

Annual capture

Gross national product
The Federal Bureau of Statistics provisionally valued this sector at Rs. 18,290 million in 2005 thus registering over 10% growth since 2000.

The fishing industry sector contributes to about 1% to the country's GNP.

Processing
Marine fish is marketed as fresh, frozen, canned, cured, reduced to fishmeal, other purposes, and some retained by fishermen for their own use. The freshwater catch is marketed fresh for local consumption. Out of the total marine fish production, the percentage for human consumption ranged between 65 and 70 percent in 2006. The rest of the catch was used for other purposes, especially reduction to fishmeal.

Fish and shrimp processing is usually divided into mechanical and non-mechanical processing. The mechanical category includes freezing plants, canning, fishmeal plants and fish liver oil extraction plants. In the non-mechanical category there are dried fish, dried shrimp, shark fin, fish maw/stomach, live lobster, live crab and fish roes/ovaries. There are 27 processing plants for the production of frozen products in Pakistan, one for canning and 8 for fishmeal processing. Almost 100 percent of the frozen and canned fishery products are exported, while the bulk of the processed fishmeal is used in the country in the manufacture of poultry feed or fish feed.

Marketing
The marketing chain for fish is similar to that for other agricultural commodities. Products are sold into the market to wholesalers and then onto retailers and end consumers through agents working on a commission basis. Farmed fish tend to be marketed either at the farm gate, through intermediaries or by open auction, where ice-packed fish is sent to fish markets and sold. Buyers of fishery products can be members of the public, retailers, wholesalers and agents for processing plants or exporters. Fish markets are very common in Sindh and at selected locations in Punjab. All markets are under the control of the local administrations. Most fish markets have inadequate facilities; usually they lack cold storage facilities, have poor hygienic conditions and inadequate communication links. Most aquaculture product is consumed locally.

Prices tend to decline when the fish is more than 3 kg; other factors include freshness of the fish and the supply–demand situation in the market. Local consumers generally prefer freshwater fish over marine fish because of their familiarity with river and inland farmed fish, as well as the fresh condition of the product. This difference is reflected in both wholesale and retail prices, where freshwater fish is sold at a higher price than marine fish.

Consumption
In the world, and hence in Pakistan, fish is considered a cheap source of protein diet. In 2000, per capita food supply from fish and fishery products (kg/person) in Pakistan was 2, in Asia was 18 and in World was 16. Whereas, fish protein as a percentage of total protein supply in Pakistan was only 1%, in Asia was 10% and in World was 6%. Processed fishery products can include fish meal (poultry feed, aquaculture feed), fish oil, fish glue etc. Out of the total marine fish production, the percentage for human consumption ranged between 65 and 70 percent in 2006. The rest of the catch was used for other purposes, especially reduction to fishmeal. The annual per capita fish consumption in Pakistan was about 2.0 kg in 2006.

See also
Agriculture in Pakistan
Forestry in Pakistan
Economy of Pakistan
Asia-Pacific Fishery Commission

Footnotes
a. Over-exploited, as total production is more than MSY.
b. Needs further assessment.

References

Further reading
Pakistan profile at countrystudies.us
Aquaculture in Pakistan at fao.org

External links
Pakistan Game Fish Association
Ministry of Food, Agriculture and Livestock - Pakistan